Martin François (born 23 December 1996) is a French professional footballer who plays for SR Delémont.

References

Living people
1996 births
Association football midfielders
French footballers
Ligue 2 players
Championnat National players
Championnat National 2 players
Championnat National 3 players
FC Sochaux-Montbéliard players
ASM Belfort players
USL Dunkerque players
FC Villefranche Beaujolais players
Louhans-Cuiseaux FC players